Popi Tsapanidou (Greek: Πόπη Τσαπανίδου) (born Parthena Tsapanidou; 20 April 1967 in Thessaloniki) is a Greek television journalist and television personality working on  Open TV, presenting the central newscast until December 23, 2022.

Since January 1, 2023, she's the Press Representative of SYRIZA.

Tsapanidou previously worked for ANT1. She owns the lifestyle website ipop.gr.

External links
 

Greek television journalists
Living people
Mass media people from Thessaloniki
1967 births